The Polytechnic Institute of Paris is a research university system located in Palaiseau, France. It consists of five engineering schools: École Polytechnique, ENSTA Paris, ENSAE Paris, Télécom Paris and Télécom SudParis.

With the Paris-Saclay University, the Polytechnic Institute of Paris is part of the Paris-Saclay project, which is a research-intensive academic campus and business cluster being developed on the Plateau de Saclay near Paris. The project integrates several engineering schools and research centers that are part of the world's top research organizations in various fields.

The technological university was formed around the École polytechnique, one of the most respected and selective grandes écoles in France. Among its alumni are three Nobel prize winners, one Fields Medalist, three Presidents of France and many CEOs of French and international companies.

History 
After World War II, the rapid growth of nuclear physics and chemistry meant that research needed more and more powerful accelerators, which required large areas. The University of Paris, the École Normale Supérieure and the Collège de France looked for space in the south of Paris near Orsay. The Orsay branch of the University of Paris eventually became an independent university, called Paris Sud University. In 1976, the École polytechnique joined the region, by moving from central Paris to Palaiseau. Other institutes joined the region in the following decades, most notably ENS Cachan, Télécom Paris, and ENSTA, as part of the Paris-Saclay project, a national effort to regroup research and business activities.

In 2015, these institutes were grouped together as a university community (ComUE) called Paris-Saclay University. The goal was to be recognized as an entity of sufficient size and quality, and to become a top-ranking, research-focused French university. Each member institution would remain independent but share a significant portion of existing and newly invested resources. This follows a model similar to the one adopted by University of Oxford and Cambridge, where each constituent college keeps its independence while being grouped under a 'university'.

Confronted with disagreements between its members (engineering schools versus universities, French Ministry of Defense versus Ministry of Higher Education), the University of Paris-Sud proposed to transform itself into Paris-Saclay University in 2017, with the engineering schools being only associated to the future institution. On October 25, 2017, the French president Emmanuel Macron announced the creation of a second university pole in Paris-Saclay, which would split away from Paris-Saclay University and regroup the engineering schools. This new pole was initially called "NewUni", and became the Polytechnic Institute of Paris in February 2019. 

HEC Paris also joined the new university pole without becoming a member. Other higher education or research institutions may join in the future. Paris-Saclay University and the Polytechnic Institute of Paris co-operate in several master's degrees and PhD programs

On September 15, 2020, the Institute co-founded with HEC Paris the artificial intelligence research center Hi! PARIS.

Organisation

Grandes écoles 
The Polytechnic Institute of Paris comprises five grandes écoles:
 École Polytechnique
 Télécom Paris
 Telecom SudParis
 ENSTA Paris
 ENSAE Paris

Research organizations 
The following research organizations have established research centers within the Polytechnic Institute of Paris. The resources contributed by these organizations will remain largely independent from other member institutions.
 CEA (Atomic Energy and Alternative Energies Commission)
 CNRS (French National Centre for Scientific Research)
 Inria (French Institute for Research in Computer Science and Automation)
 INSERM (French Institute of Health and Medical Research)
 Institut des Hautes Études Scientifiques (Institute of Advanced Scientific Studies)
 INRA (French National Institute for Agricultural Sciences)
 ONERA (National Board of Study and Aerospace Research)
 SOLEIL (national synchrotron facility)

University rankings 

In international rankings, the Polytechnic Institute of France is ranked 48th overall and 12th in graduate employability by QS World University Rankings. It is ranked 91st by Times Higher Education, 301-400 by the Shanghai Ranking, and 41st in the world by the CWUR Ranking.

See also 

 List of public universities in France by academy
 Paris-Saclay Medical School

References

External links 
 

Paris-Saclay
Universities and colleges in Paris